Ian Watson (born 20 April 1943) is a British science fiction writer. He lives in Gijón, Spain.

Life
In 1959, Watson worked as an accounts clerk at Runciman's, a Newcastle shipping company. The experience was not particularly satisfying.

Watson graduated in English Literature from Balliol College, Oxford, in 1963; in 1965 he earned a research degree in English and French 19th-century literature.

Watson lectured English in Tanzania (1965–67) and Tokyo (1967–70), and taught Future Studies at the Birmingham Polytechnic from 1970 to 1976. After 1976 he devoted himself to his career as a professional writer.

His first novel, The Embedding, winner of the Prix Apollo in 1975, is unusual for being based on ideas from generative grammar; the title refers to the process of center embedding.  He is a prolific writer, having written more than two dozen novels, among them Miracle Visitors, God's World, The Jonah Kit and The Flies of Memory; and many collections of short stories. Watson is credited as author of the screen story for the motion picture A.I. Artificial Intelligence. In 1977, The Jonah Kit won the BSFA Award for Best Novel.

During 1980, Watson and Michael Bishop wrote the first transatlantic SF novel collaboration, Under Heaven's Bridge, using typewriters and postal services.

He has also written a series of novels relating to the Warhammer 40,000 line of games: Space Marine, and the Inquisition War trilogy of Inquisitor, Harlequin and Chaos Child (republished in 2002 by The Black Library, with Inquisitor retitled Draco). Other recent stories have been published in US magazine Weird Tales, the Canadian anthology Lust For Life, New Writings in the Fantastic, the Mammoth Book of Best New Erotica volume 7, and in a few more books. Some of these stories have been translated into non-English languages.

A collaboration with Italian surrealist writer Roberto Quaglia has produced a book, The Beloved of My Beloved, launched during April 2009 during Eastercon.

His major work of recent years is The Waters of Destiny co-written with Andy West.

Bibliography

Novels
 
 
 Orgasmachine. Paris: Editions Champ Libre, 1976.
 The Martian Inca. London: Gollancz, 1977. 
 Alien Embassy. London: Gollancz, 1977. 
 Miracle Visitors. London: Gollancz, 1978. 
 God's World. London, Gollancz, 1979. 
 The Gardens of Delight. London: Gollancz, 1980. 
 Deathhunter. London: Gollancz, 1981. 
 Under Heaven's Bridge, with Michael Bishop. London: Gollancz, 1982. 
 Chekhov's Journey. London: Gollancz, 1983. 
 Converts. London: Granada, 1984 (paper). 
 The Books of the Black Current:
 The Book of the River. London: Gollancz, 1984. 
 The Book of the Stars. London: Gollancz, 1984. 
 The Book of Being. London: Gollancz, 1985. 
 Yaleen, omnibus edition. Dallas, TX: BenBella Books, 2004 
 Queenmagic, Kingmagic. London: Gollancz, 1986. 
 The Power. London: Headline, 1987. 
 Whores of Babylon. London: Paladin, 1988 (paper). 
 Meat. London: Headline, 1988. 
 The Fire Worm. London: Gollancz, 1988. 
 The Flies of Memory. London: Gollancz, 1990. 
 The Books of Mana:
 Lucky's Harvest. London: Gollancz, 1993. 
 The Fallen Moon. London: Gollancz, 1994. 
 Hard Questions. London: Gollancz, 1996. 
 Oracle. London: Gollancz, 1997. 
 Mockymen. Urbana, IL: Golden Gryphon Press, 2003. 
 Orgasmachine. Alconbury Weston: NewCon Press, 2010. 
 The Waters of Destiny (with Andy West)
 Assassins. Palabaristas Press, 2012
 Tongue of Knowledge. Palabaristas Press, 2012
 Death Overflows. Palabaristas Press, 2012

Warhammer 40,000
 The Inquisition War trilogy:
 Inquisitor (vt 2002 Draco). Brighton: GW Books, 1990 (paper). 
 Harlequin. London: Boxtree, 1994. 
 Chaos Child. London: Boxtree, 1995. 
 Space Marine. London: Boxtree, 1993 (paper).

Short fiction 
Collections
 The Very Slow Time Machine. London: Gollancz, 1979. 
 Sunstroke and Other Stories. London: Gollancz, 1982. 
 Slow Birds and Other Stories. London: Gollancz, 1985. 
 The Book of Ian Watson. Willimantic: Mark V. Zeising, 1985. 
 Evil Water and Other Stories. London: Gollancz, 1987. 
 Salvage Rites and Other Stories. London: Gollancz, 1989. 
 Stalin's Teardrops. London: Gollancz, 1991. 
 The Coming of Vertumnus. London: Gollancz, 1994. 
 The Great Escape. Urbana, IL: Golden Gryphon Press, 2002. 
 The Butterflies of Memory. Harrogate: PS Publishing, 2006. 
 Saving for a Sunny Day. Alconbury Weston: NewCon Press, 2012. 
Stories

Poetry 

List of poems

References

Other sources
Contributors Bio for Helix: A Speculative Fiction Quarterly

External links
 
 
 The Beloved of My Beloved, homepage of the 2009 book (Watson and Roberto Quaglia)
 The Waters of Destiny , homepage of the 2012 trilogy (Watson and Andy West)
 

1943 births
Living people
20th-century British novelists
20th-century British male writers
21st-century British novelists
21st-century English male writers
Alumni of Balliol College, Oxford
Analog Science Fiction and Fact people
Asimov's Science Fiction people
British male novelists
British science fiction writers
Warhammer 40,000 writers